Amity International School Vasundhara located in Sector 1 & sector 6, Vasundhra, Ghaziabad is the 6th in the chain of schools established by Ritnand Balved Education Foundation, New Delhi, founded by Ashok Chauhan. The current chairperson of the schools is Amita Chauhan. It is a co-educational English medium public school providing schooling from Nursery to Senior Secondary level. The school started functioning in April 2005 up to class VII. Now it is up to class XII. School started its first session in the year 2005–06.

In 2017, the parents of school students protested against the alleged fee hike by Amity International School. Parents of other private school's students also protested for the same cause across Delhi-NCR. According to Delhi High Court judgment, all private schools school fee hikes were stopped.

References

External links
 

International schools in India
Primary schools in Uttar Pradesh
High schools and secondary schools in Uttar Pradesh
Schools in Ghaziabad, Uttar Pradesh
Educational institutions established in 2005
2005 establishments in Uttar Pradesh